Yubbe (also known as  Yobe, Yube, Yubeh and Yubbe Tug) is a town in the Sanaag of Somaliland . There is a Somaliland military base.

History

Archaeology
A desert town mostly inhabited by nomads, Yubbe is home to numerous old archaeological structures. While visiting the locality in the 19th century, the British explorer John Hanning Speke described having seen various tumuli. Of these, he reported that one contained "a hollow compartment propped up by beams of timber, at the bottom of which, buried in the ground, were several earthenware pots, some leaden coins, a ring of gold such as the Indian Mussulman women wear in their noses, and various other miscellaneous property."

Somali Civil War

On June 18, 1991, just after the start of the Somali civil war, an inter-clan meeting was held in Yubbe at the call from Warsangali clan chief Aaqil Bashir to Habar Yoonis clan chief Warsame Hersi (Yubbe 1). At the meeting, a resolution was passed to end hostilities and share grazing land. The October 6–9 rally (Yubbe 2) resulted in a ceasefire and boundary agreement between the Warsangali and Habar Yoonis clans.

In June 1993, a meeting of the Warsangari in Hadaftimo and Habar Yoonis clans was held in Yubbe (Yubbe 3), and it was resolved that the Habar Yoonis clan would hold a meeting in Erigavo to which all clan assemblies of the Sanag, including the rival Habr Je'lo and Dhulbahante clans, would be invited.

In 2006, a severe water shortage hit Sanag, and a well in the village of Yubbe was found to be failing.

Puntland–Somaliland dispute
In 2007, the conflict between Puntland and Somaliland sharpened when the Somaliland army took advantage of internal conflicts within Puntland to occupy Las Anod (Puntland–Somaliland dispute.)

In October 2015, the chairman of the Somaliland Election Commission in Sanaag region was abducted in Yubbe and taken to Puntland-controlled Badhan.

In March 2019, Somaliland troops blocked traffic between Yubbe and Hadaftimo. Local residents demonstrated against the Somaliland army's advance. The elders of Erigavo met secretly to demand the withdrawal of the Somaliland army from Yubbe.

In August 2019, the Puntland-appointed governor of the Sanaag region announced that "the Somaliland army has withdrawn from the Sanaag region, with the exception of Yubbe, and the militias on the Puntland side have been nationalized."

In November 2019, residents of Yubbe witnessed a group of al-Shabaab members in the neighborhood Ga'an-Marodi.

In February 2020, Somaliland troops from Yubbe fought Puntland troops in Kadhada village, 18 kilometers away. After the battle, Puntland forces claimed victory over Somaliland forces, capturing prisoners and military vehicles.

In March 2021, the Somaliland-appointed governor of the Sanaag region, who lives in Erigavo, called on the residents of Yubbe to cooperate with him, as a planned maternity hospital and other development projects in Yubbe have been suspended.

Demographics
The town is inhabited by Warsangeli sub-division of the Harti Darod.

See also

Amud
Heis
El Ayo
Damo
Mosylon
Opone
Gelweita

Notes

References
Yube, Somalia

Populated places in Sanaag
Cities in Somaliland
Archaeological sites in Somaliland